"I Choose You" is the third episode of the twelfth season of the American television medical drama Grey's Anatomy, and the show's 248th episode overall. It was written by William Harper and directed by Rob Corn. It aired on the American Broadcasting Company in the United States on October 8, 2015. In the episode, Dr. Jo Wilson expresses uncertainty about the future of her relationship with Alex Karev after discovering evidence he may have children with Dr. Izzie Stevens (Katherine Heigl). She confides in her close friend, Dr. Stephanie Edwards (Jerrika Hinton) about this.

Meanwhile, Maggie Pierce (Kelly McCreary) re-evaluates her life choices after receiving an invitation to her ex-boyfriend's wedding. Richard Webber questions Chief Miranda Bailey's loyalty, and Alex struggles with a decision that will affect the lives of newborn twins.

The episode picks up on an unresolved storyline from the fifth season episode, "Elevator Love Letter". The storyline is subsequently resolved in the season 16 episode, "Leave a Light On" which coincided with Chambers' character's departure from the series. Kim Raver (Dr. Teddy Altman) reprised her role as a guest-star, in addition to Jesse Williams (Dr. Jackson Avery) and Mitch Pileggi (Larry Jennings). The title of the episode is a reference to the song "I Choose You" by American musician Sara Bareilles. "I Choose You"  was well-received by television critics. Upon its initial airing, the episode was viewed by 8.12 million Americans, ranked #2 in its time-slot, and garnered a 2.2/8 Nielsen rating/share in the 18–49 demographic.

Plot
The episode begins with a traditional voiceover by general surgeon Dr. Meredith Grey (Ellen Pompeo), where she states the body is a bundle of possibility. She states, "Every time we cut one open, we're faced with a series of decisions. Some choices are made for you. But for the most part, surgery is a choose your own adventure. When you're faced with the tough choices, it comes down to you. What can you live with? What can you leave behind? Right or wrong, you have to decide what you're willing to go down fighting for. The choice is yours." She carpools with sisters, Maggie Pierce (Kelly McCreary) and Amelia Shepherd (Caterina Scorsone), but expresses annoyance over both Amelia's nakedness changing in the car, stating her children sit in that seat, and Maggie's denial over a wide-eyed expression reading a notice for Meredith's promotion as Head of General following Bailey's promotion as Chief of Surgery.

Dr. Richard Webber (James Pickens Jr.) overhears Dr. Callie Torres (Sara Ramirez) inform Meredith she has been lowballed regarding her new salary as head of general surgery. Callie and the sisters urge Meredith to renegotiate her salary as they chat in her house. Maggie expresses apprehension about her invitation to ex-boyfriend, Dr. Ethan Boyd (Lance Gross)'s wedding, culminating in her kissing Andrew DeLuca (Giacomo Gianniotti) at Joe (Steven W. Bailey)'s bar.

Dr. Arizona Robbins is a consult on an OB/GYN case involving a pregnant mother of twins, Laurie Kiefer (Jennifer Marsala). Robbins pages Dr. Alex Karev (Justin Chambers), head of pediatrics. Laurie delivers fraternal twins, a girl and a boy, but both children are severely jaundiced and need extra care. DeLuca asks why Robbins and Karev are shocked, and Dr. Ben Warren (Jason George) explains both fraternal twins have a tumor, and now they must tell the parents their twins are dying. They reveal the kids need liver transplants and Alex informs the parents that he will decide which child will have a donour, based on the strength of the child.

In the bathroom, surgical resident Dr. Jo Wilson (Camilla Luddington) feels sick about information she has found out in the morning. Stephanie Edwards (Hinton) states she needs to tell Alex. In the hospital elevator, Jo awkwardly asks Alex if he wants kids, much to his confusion. Arizona suggests Jo may be pregnant, and withdrawing from telling him. When Alex comes home after staying up all night to make contacts for the less healthy twin getting a donor, Jo confronts Alex with an invoice from the fertility clinic about his embryos with Dr. Izzie Stevens (Katherine Heigl) seven years prior. She questions her value in their relationship in comparison to his previous relationship with Izzie, feeling she was worth it to him. The two reconcile the argument, as Alex pulls down his pants to "make a baby" and Jo laughs at the propesterousness of the idea, stating she is in the middle of her residency and he is never home. He climbs on the bed on top of her, as both laugh and giggle.

Meanwhile, Dr. Jackson Avery (Jesse Williams) expresses frustrations with Dr. April Kepner (Sarah Drew) who has returned from the army, stating he is changing the locks and wants a divorce. April urges him not to. The next day, she returns, planning to thank him, only to discover Jackson has moved out to live with Ben and Bailey instead.

Production
The episode was written by William Harper and directed by Rob Corn. The episode is designed with a misdirect storyline, making the viewer assume Camilla Luddington's character feels sick due to being pregnant. However, she eventually reveals she has found an invoice from the fertility clinic of Alex and Izzie's embryos. Previously, Luddington asked whether Jo had been aware of the embryos and said that it could "potentially be a big issue" in a 2015 interview at San Diego Comic Con.

Reception

Broadcasting 
"I Choose You" was first broadcast on October 8, 2015 in the United States on ABC. The episode was viewed by a total of 8.1 million Americans, In terms of viewership, the episode adjusted upwards for viewership, alongside How to Get Away with Murder, the only scripted shows to do so.

Critical reception 

The episode was well-received by television critics. Many singled out Chambers' character, Alex Karev and his series long character development. However, the appearance of the sick jaundiced child was negatively received by multiple critics, and described by one critic as the child resembling an "oversized Sour Patch Kid".

Several critics noted the remembrance of Heigl's former character. TVFanatic critic Ashley Bissette Sumerel expressed surprise the episode "even reminds us about the fact that Izzie used to exist". Hollywood Life'''s Chris Rogers commented, "Damn you, Shonda Rhimes — you get us every time! We've been dying for an Izzie Stevens comeback since she left Grey's Anatomy in 2010, so just the mere mention of her name on the Oct. 8 episode was a tease we almost couldn't handle. And now, there's a perfect reason for her to return."

For Cosmopolitan, Lauren Hoffman noted April Kepner (Sarah Drew) as "creepy", pointing out a Fatal Attraction reference made by Jesse Williams' character, Jackson Avery. Andy Patrick for TVLine noted how the episode subverted expectations by making the viewer assume Jo was pregnant in the bathroom scene with Stephanie, before revealing she had found the embryos with Izzie.

She described the episode as "belonging to Alex Karev" and praised his development as a "smartass kid from an abusive household in Iowa who somehow grew up into this mature, whip-smart surgeon." She stated, "The father can donate his liver to one of them, and Alex say's he'll be the one to decide." Ariana Bacle for Entertainment Weekly felt that Grey's had gone "Sophie's Choice" and it was "not fun" watching the choice made to save the healthier twin baby. However, Hoffman felt "What follows is less "Alex's Choice" and more a showcase of who Alex has become. He calms the parents' fears. He commands the team of doctors working to save the babies and perform surgery on the dad. He researches, tirelessly. And finally, after tests on tests, he chooses the girl twin for the transplant." Brittany Lovely for Hypable commented on Alex's growth, stating, "Alex is no longer a toddler finding his way around the hospital, he is taking on the parental role and guiding by example."

For TVFanatic, Ashley Bissette Sumerel gave a 4.7 out of 5.0 rating and praised Chambers' character Alex as having "probably grown more than any other character". She stated, "THIS is how Grey's Anatomy is supposed to be". Complimenting the season as a whole, she stated: "So far, this season has done exactly as we hoped it would, reminding us of all the reasons we used to love this show." She further commented on the series having "gone back to its roots, with the kinds of stories and the kind of tone we fell in love with way back when", and complimented the decision to move the sisters back to Meredith's old house."

Bacle praised Maggie's rant to Meredith drinking wine calling herself an "alien with no home and she wants to have sex", and called it "probably the most entertaining monologue to appear on Grey’s in the history of Grey’s. More drunken alien-focused rants from Maggie, please!" Regarding Meredith's decision to request for a higher salary, she pondered, "Do these more politically minded plotlines sometimes come off a little forced, a little cheesy? Sure. But they’re also inspiring in their Grey’s-specific, I’m-going-to-show-you-all-my-emotions-and-hope-that-works-in-my-favor way. And that is what makes Grey’s Grey’s'', for better or for worse. So keep rising, Meredith. Keep rising."

References

External links

Grey's Anatomy (season 12) episodes
2015 American television episodes